The Stephen Gaynor School is an independent private, special education school in Manhattan, New York, United States, associated with New York Interschool. The school was started with five students in 1962. Today, approximately 380 students ages three to fourteen with a range of language-based learning differences attend the school.

History

Stephen Gaynor School was founded in 1962 by Miriam Michael and Yvette Siegel-Herzog. They enrolled their first class in 1962 with five students, housed in a two-room Upper East Side apartment. The school upgraded to a townhouse. Today, the school enrolls approximately 380 students and operates a two-building campus totaling nearly 80,000 square feet.

Accreditation
Stephen Gaynor School is accredited by the New York State Association of Independent Schools (NYSAIS). The school is also an Organizational Member of the Orton-Gillingham Academy, and a Member of the Academy's Council of Accredited Programs. Stephen Gaynor School's program meets the International Dyslexia Association's Knowledge and Practice Standard. Stephen Gaynor School is also a member of the Independent Schools Admissions Association of Greater New York (ISAAGNY).

References

External links

Educational institutions established in 1962
Private elementary schools in Manhattan
Private middle schools in Manhattan
Schools in Manhattan
Private K–8 schools in Manhattan
Special schools in the United States